Perejil Island (or), also known as Parsley Island, is a small, uninhabited rocky islet located  off the coast of Morocco. It is administered by Spain as one of the plazas de soberanía, and its sovereignty is disputed by Morocco. It was the subject of an armed incident between the two countries in 2002.

Name 
The name Isla de Perejil literally means "Parsley Island" in Spanish. Its original Berber name is Tura, meaning "empty". It is sometimes referred to in Arabic as "Jazirat al-Ma'danus", which is a translation of "Parsley Island".

In Moroccan historical references, it is only known as "Tura". In his speech to the Moroccan people commemorating the "Throne Day" on 30 July 2002, the King of Morocco used the name "Tura" exclusively, when he mentioned the armed incident with Spain over the island.

Geography 

History 
In 1415, Portugal, along with the reconquest of Ceuta (Part of the old Hispania Tangeriana), took possession of the nearby islet from the Marinid Sultanate, a predecessor to the current state of Morocco. In 1580, Portugal came under the sovereignty of Philip I of Portugal, who was also King of Spain, creating an Iberian Union under one king, without unifying the countries. When the Union split in 1640, Ceuta remained under Spanish sovereignty.

Spain-Morocco disputes 

The islet's sovereignty is disputed by Morocco and Spain. Local Moroccan shepherds used it for grazing livestock, but the vast majority of Spaniards and Moroccans had not heard of the islet until 11 July 2002, when a group of Moroccan soldiers set up a base on the islet. The Moroccan government said that they set foot on the island in order to monitor illegal immigration, a justification the Spanish government rejected as there had been little co-operation on the matter at the time (a repeated source of complaint from Spain). After protests from the Spanish government, led by Prime Minister José María Aznar, Morocco replaced the soldiers with cadets from the Moroccan Navy, who then installed a fixed base on the island. This further angered the Spanish government and both countries restated their claims to the islet. Almost all European Union member states fully supported Spain's objections, with the exception of France and Portugal, whose government issued a statement regretting the incident. Morocco's claims had official support from the Arab League, except for Algeria, which restated its recognition of Spanish sovereignty over the exclaves of Ceuta and Melilla.

On the morning of 18 July 2002, Spain launched Operation Romeo-Sierra, a military attempt to take over the island. The operation was successful, and within hours the Spanish had taken control of the island and custody of the Moroccan naval cadets, who had not resisted the Spanish commando attack force, Grupo de Operaciones Especiales III. The operation was launched in conjunction with the Spanish Navy and Spanish Air Force. The Spanish transferred the captured Moroccans by helicopter to the headquarters of the Guardia Civil in Ceuta, who then transported the cadets to the Moroccan border. Over the course of the day, the Spanish Legion replaced the commandos and remained on the island until Morocco, after mediation by the United States, led by Colin Powell, agreed to return to the status quo ante which existed prior to the Moroccan occupation of the island. The islet is now deserted.

Sovereignty 
Perejil Island has no permanent human population. Goats are pastured there, and the Moroccan government expressed worries that smugglers and terrorists, in addition to illegal immigrants, were using the island. The island is well monitored from both sides in order to maintain the status quo that leaves it deserted and virtually a no man's land.

Morocco want to control the Spanish cities Ceuta and Melilla along with several small rocks and islets off the coast of Morocco. The crisis over Perejil Island was seen by the Spanish government as a way for Morocco to test the waters in regard to Spain's will to defend Ceuta and Melilla.

Migration 
In June 2014, Spain requested that the Moroccan forces enter the island to expel sub-Saharan migrants.

Popular culture 
The international incident is recounted in a 2016 film, La Isla, which is largely based on the facts of the dispute.

See also 
 List of Spanish colonial wars in Morocco
 Spanish Morocco

References

External links 

 Isla Perejil in Google Maps
 Speech King Mohammed VI

Mediterranean islands
Disputed islands
Territorial disputes of Morocco
Territorial disputes of Spain
Strait of Gibraltar
Uninhabited islands